Rentapia hosii, also known as the Boulenger's Asian tree toad, common tree toad, tree toad, House's tree toad (sic), Malayan brown toad, brown tree toad, or Asian yellow-spotted climbing toad, is a species of toad in the family Bufonidae. It is found in the Malay Peninsula (including extreme southern peninsular Thailand), Borneo (Indonesia, Brunei, and Malaysia), and Sumatra (Indonesia).

Rentapia hosii is an arboreal toad found in forest and other dense vegetation along large lowland rivers, at elevations below . It breeds in clear forest streams. After metamorphosis, juveniles disperse through the surrounding forest, gradually becoming arboreal.

References

External links
 Amphibian and Reptiles of Peninsular Malaysia 
 Sound recordings of Pedostibes hosii at BioAcoustica

hosii
Amphibians of Brunei
Amphibians of Indonesia
Amphibians of Malaysia
Amphibians of Thailand
Taxa named by George Albert Boulenger
Amphibians described in 1892
Taxonomy articles created by Polbot
Amphibians of Borneo